Foreman Peak is a peak,  high, standing  west of Dzema Peak on the north side of the Watson Escarpment, Antarctica. It was named by the Advisory Committee on Antarctic Names for Donald L. Foreman, a mechanic with U.S. Navy Squadron VX-6 who wintered at Little America V in 1958 and McMurdo Station in 1960.

References 

Mountains of Marie Byrd Land